Abbas Abdo Kenaan (born 25 November 1982) is a Lebanese former footballer who played as a defender.

After one year at Bourj, Kenaan played his whole senior club career at Ahed; he also represented Lebanon internationally between 2003 and 2011.

Honours 
Bourj
 Lebanese Second Division: 2000–01

Ahed
 Lebanese Premier League: 2007–08, 2009–10, 2010–11, 2014–15
 Lebanese FA Cup: 2003–04, 2004–05, 2008–09, 2010–11
 Lebanese Elite Cup: 2008, 2010, 2011, 2013, 2015
 Lebanese Federation Cup: 2004
 Lebanese Super Cup: 2008, 2010, 2011, 2015

Individual
 Lebanese Premier League Team of the Season: 2003–04, 2004–05, 2009–10, 2010–11

References

External links
 
 

1982 births
Living people
People from Baalbek
Lebanese footballers
Association football defenders
Association football central defenders
Association football fullbacks
Bourj FC players
Al Ahed FC players
Lebanese Premier League players
Lebanese Second Division players
Lebanon international footballers